The 2003 Bremen state election was held on 25 May 2003 to elect the members of the Bürgerschaft of Bremen, as well as the city councils of Bremen and Bremerhaven. The incumbent grand coalition of the Social Democratic Party (SPD) and Christian Democratic Union (CDU) led by Mayor Henning Scherf retained its majority and continued in office.

Parties
The table below lists parties represented in the previous Bürgerschaft of Bremen.

Opinion polling

Election result

|-
! colspan="2" | Party
! Votes
! %
! +/-
! Seats
! +/-
! Seats %
|-
| bgcolor=| 
| align=left | Social Democratic Party (SPD)
| align=right| 123,480
| align=right| 42.3
| align=right| 0.3
| align=right| 40
| align=right| 7
| align=right| 48.2
|-
| bgcolor=| 
| align=left | Christian Democratic Union (CDU)
| align=right| 86,819
| align=right| 29.8
| align=right| 7.3
| align=right| 29
| align=right| 13
| align=right| 34.9
|-
| bgcolor=| 
| align=left | Alliance 90/The Greens (Grüne)
| align=right| 37,350
| align=right| 12.8
| align=right| 3.9
| align=right| 12
| align=right| 2
| align=right| 14.5
|-
| bgcolor=| 
| align=left | Free Democratic Party (FDP)
| align=right| 12,294
| align=right| 4.2
| align=right| 1.7
| align=right| 1
| align=right| 1
| align=right| 1.2
|-
| bgcolor=| 
| align=left | German People's Union (DVU)
| align=right| 6,642
| align=right| 2.3
| align=right| 0.7
| align=right| 1
| align=right| 0
| align=right| 1.2
|-
! colspan=8|
|-
| bgcolor=blue| 
| align=left | Party for a Rule of Law Offensive (PRO)
| align=right| 12,876
| align=right| 4.4
| align=right| 4.4
| align=right| 0
| align=right| ±0
| align=right| 0
|-
| bgcolor=| 
| align=left | Party of Democratic Socialism (PDS)
| align=right| 4,885
| align=right| 1.7
| align=right| 1.2
| align=right| 0
| align=right| ±0
| align=right| 0
|-
| bgcolor=|
| align=left | Others
| align=right| 7,420
| align=right| 2.5
| align=right| 
| align=right| 0
| align=right| ±0
| align=right| 0
|-
! align=right colspan=2| Total
! align=right| 291,766
! align=right| 100.0
! align=right| 
! align=right| 83
! align=right| 17
! align=right| 
|-
! align=right colspan=2| Voter turnout
! align=right| 
! align=right| 61.3
! align=right| 1.2
! align=right| 
! align=right| 
! align=right| 
|}

Sources
 The Federal Returning Officer

Elections in Bremen (state)
2003 elections in Germany
May 2003 events in Europe